Bahay Mo Ba 'To? is a situational comedy series broadcast by GMA Network. Starring Wendell Ramos, it premiered on September 14, 2004, on the network's KiliTV line up replacing All Together Now. The series concluded on July 10, 2007, with a total of 148 episodes.

The series is streaming online on YouTube.

Cast and characters

Lead cast
 Ronaldo Valdez as Nene Mulingtapang / Unyo
 Tessie Tomas as Baby Mulingtapang-Benoit / Anying

Supporting cast
 Wendell Ramos as Manny Boy Mulingtapang
 Gladys Reyes as Kelly Mulingtapang
 Bea Binene as Junabeth Mulingtapang
 Gabriel Roxas as Julius Mulingtapang
 Sherilyn Reyes as Jessica Benoit
 Sunshine Dizon as Dorothy Benoit / Pirena
 Jacob Chen as Raymond Benoit
 Cherie Gil as Tet Ano
 Keempee de Leon as Harold Mangaluntoy
 Francine Prieto as Jingle
 Tiya Pusit as Bella
 Dino Guevarra as Canor
 Carlito Campos, Jr. as Mang Enriquez
 Chynna Ortaleza as Tintin
 Vincent Enero as Michika

Accolades

References

External links
 
 

2004 Philippine television series debuts
2007 Philippine television series endings
Filipino-language television shows
GMA Network original programming
Philippine comedy television series